Coscinocercus is an extinct genus of Glyptodont. It lived during the Late Miocene, and its fossilized remains were discovered in South America.

Description

This animal, like all glyptodonts, had a carapace formed by numerous osteoderms fused together, protecting most of its body. Osteoderms from the dorsal carapace and the mobile rings of the tail show very numerous peripheral figures, among which were large perforations. The caudal tube was robust and its central figures were often separated by two rows of flat polygonal figures, with numerous perforations occupying the junction points of the furrows. Its appearance was probably quite similar to Plohophorus.

Classification

The genus Coscinocercus was first described in 1939 by Cabrera, based on fossil remains found in the Argentine pampa, in Late Miocene terrains. Two species were attributed to this genus, Coscinocercus marcalaini and C. brachyurus, mainly distinguished by specifities of the carapace, that might only be intraspecific variations.

Coscinocercus was a member of the tribe Hoplophorini, a clade of glyptodonts. It was related to the genera Plohophorus and Phlyctaenopyga. Some evidences tends to suggest that it was synonymous with another Late Miocene genus, Pseudoplohophorus

Bibliography
Cabrera, A. 1939. Sobre vertebrados fósiles del Plioceno de Adolfo Alsina. Revista del Museo de La Plata 2: 3–35.
Zetti, J. 1972. [Los Mamíferos fósiles de edad Huayqueriense (Plioceno Medio) de la Región Pampeana. Tesis Doctoral. Facultad de Ciencias Naturales y*Museo, Universidad Nacional de La Plata, La Plata, 86 p.].

Prehistoric cingulates
Prehistoric placental genera
Miocene xenarthrans
Miocene first appearances
Miocene mammals of South America
Miocene extinctions
Neogene Argentina
Fossils of Argentina
Fossil taxa described in 1939